The 150th Peacekeeping Battalion is a military unit of the Armed Forces of Mongolia. It was the first unit that designated for peace-support operations. Operatively, it reports to the Peacekeeping Operations Office (PKOO) of the General Staff of the Mongolian Armed Forces, being deployed in the city of Ulaanbaatar.

History 
In 1997, the Mongolian armed forces established the battalion as primarily a combat unit. By order of President Natsagiin Bagabandi however, its duties changed in preparation for peacekeeping missions.  Later, the battalion started conducting peacekeeping operations training an in September 2000, one platoon from the battalion participated in CENTRAZBAT 2000 in Kazakhstan, the country's first ever multinational peacekeeping field exercise. It also took part in the multinational peacekeeping exercise SHANTEE-DOOT in Bangladesh in 2002. 

In 2010, it was trained by US Marines and the Alaska National Guard. It has taken part in the Khaan Quest exercise.

Operations

Iraq 
In early 2004, the then-Chairman of the Joint Chiefs of Staff of the United States, General Richard Myers, visited Mongolia and expressed his appreciation for the deployment of a 173-strong contingent from the battalion to Iraq, which was planned to send a fresh force to replace the first contingent later in January 2004. 

All troops were withdrawn on September 25, 2008.

Africa 
On November 17, 2009, Deputy Assistant Secretary of Defense James Schear had lunch with troops from the battalion bound for Chad on November 20, 2009.

See also 
 15th Separate Motor Rifle Brigade
 KAZBAT

References 

Military units and formations of Mongolia
Military units and formations established in 1997
1997 establishments in Mongolia
Peacekeeping
Infantry battalions